Once Were Warriors is a 1994 New Zealand drama film based on New Zealand author Alan Duff's bestselling 1990 first novel. The film tells the story of the Heke family, an urban Māori family, and their problems with poverty, alcoholism, and domestic violence, mostly brought on by the patriarch, Jake. The film was directed by Lee Tamahori, written by Riwia Brown, and stars Rena Owen, Temuera Morrison and Cliff Curtis. It became the highest-grossing film of all-time in New Zealand, and has won numerous awards.

Plot
Beth leaves her small Māori village and, much to her parents' chagrin, marries Jake "The Muss" Heke. After eighteen years, they live in an unkempt state house in South Auckland and have five children. Their interpretations of life and being Māori are tested.

Jake is fired from his job, but remains satisfied with receiving unemployment benefit and spending most days getting drunk at a nearby pub with his friends. He shows his violent streak by savagely beating a muscular patron who dares disrupt a female singer's (Mere Boynton) performance. He often invites crowds of friends from the bar to his home for drunken parties. When his wife "gets lippy", he brutally beats her in front of the group, who are too intimidated to interfere. Beth turns to booze when things go wrong, and exhibits angry outbursts and occasional violence of her own on a smaller scale. Her children fend for themselves, resignedly cleaning the blood-streaked house after their father beats their mother.

Nig, the eldest son of the Heke family, moves out to join a gang whose rituals include getting facial tattoos. He undergoes an initiation beating, passes and is then embraced as a new brother. Nig cares about his siblings but despises his father; he is angered when his mother is beaten but does not intervene. Nig's younger brother Mark, aka "Boogie", is placed in a foster home as a ward of the state due to his parents' home life. Jake is unconcerned and hopes the experience will toughen him up. Despite his initial anger, Boogie finds a new niche for himself after the foster home's manager, Mr. Bennett, helps him embrace his Māori heritage.

Grace, Jake and Beth's 13-year-old daughter, keeps a journal in which she chronicles events, as well as stories she tells her younger siblings. Her best friend is a homeless boy named Toot, who lives in a wrecked car. She dreads a future she believes is inevitable and is constantly reminded of getting married and playing the role of a wife, which she believes comprises catering to a husband's demands and enduring beatings. She dreams of living an independent and single life.

Grace is raped by Uncle Bully, a friend of her father. She falls into a deep depression and seeks support from Toot, with whom she smokes marijuana for the first time. Toot kisses her but she reacts violently and storms out, believing he is "just like the rest of them". Confused, Grace eventually goes home to an angry Jake with his friends. Bully asks for a goodnight kiss to test his power over her. She refuses and Jake sees it as a sign of disrespect; he rips her journal in two and nearly beats her. Beth returns home from searching for Grace, and then screams hysterically after finding her daughter has hanged herself from a tree branch in the backyard.

Jake selfishly deals with the tragedy by going to the pub while the rest of his family takes Grace's body to a tangihanga. Beth stands up to him for the first time when he refuses to let her be taken to the marae. The film cross-cuts between the mourning, Jake's drinking and the family on the marae. Boogie impresses Beth with his Māori singing at the funeral, and Toot says his goodbyes, telling Grace the gentle kiss he gave her the last time he saw her was a gesture meant only to confirm their mantra 'best friends for life'. Boogie reassures Toot that Grace loved him, and Beth invites him to live with them.

Reading Grace's diary later that day, Beth finds out about the rape and confronts Bully at the pub. Jake initially threatens Beth for accusing his friend, but Nig steps between them, protecting his mother. After glancing at the diary himself, Jake explodes in a rage and beats Bully nearly to death, castrating him with a broken bottle. Beth, blaming Jake just as much as Bully because of his violent lifestyle, decides to take their children back to her Māori village and traditions, defiantly telling him that her heritage gives her the strength to resist his control over her. Jake shouts at her on a kerb outside the pub as the family leaves, with police sirens wailing in the background.

Cast
 Rena Owen as Beth Heke
 Temuera Morrison as Jake "the Muss" Heke
 Julian Arahanga as Nig Heke
 Mamaengaroa Kerr-Bell as Grace Heke
 Taungaroa Emile as Mark "Boogie" Heke
 Rachael Morris Jr. as Polly Heke
 Joseph Kairau as Huata Heke
 George Henare as Mr. Bennett
 Cliff Curtis as Uncle Bully
 Pete Smith as Dooley
 Calvin Tuteao as Taka
 Shannon Williams as Toot
 Mere Boynton as Mavis

Production
Once Were Warriors is the first feature film produced by Communicado Productions. The production won Best Film at the Durban International Film Festival, Montreal World Film Festival, New Zealand Film & Television Awards, and Rotterdam Film Festival. It also became at the time the highest-grossing film in New Zealand, surpassing The Piano (1993). Once Were Warriors was nominated for the Grand Prix of the Belgian Syndicate of Cinema Critics.

The film was shot at a local state house, located at 33 O'Connor Street, Otara, in the Auckland metropolitan area. The neighbours of the house used for filming complained on numerous occasions due to the film's late night party scenes.

Release
The film opened at 4 theatres in Auckland and Hamilton, New Zealand in May 1994.

Reception

Critical reception
Once Were Warriors was critically lauded on release.  On Metacritic the film has a score of 77% based on reviews from 20 critics, indicating "generally favorable reviews".

Roger Ebert gave the film three and a half stars out of four and observed: "Once Were Warriors has been praised as an attack on domestic violence and abuse. So it is. But I am not sure anyone needs to see this film to discover that such brutality is bad. We know that. I value it for two other reasons: its perception in showing the way alcohol triggers sudden personality shifts, and its power in presenting two great performances by Morrison and Owen. You don't often see acting like this in the movies. They bring the Academy Awards into perspective."

In The Movie Show review of 1994, Margaret Pomeranz called Once Were Warriors "a very impressive big screen debut from director Lee Tamahori," while also praising the cinematography of Stuart Dryburgh and the performances of the films leads, Morrison and Owen. Co-host David Stratton described the film as "astonishing," "absolutely devastating," and "a really, really, really good film." Stratton also compared Once Were Warriors favourably with New Zealand's Heavenly Creatures of the same year. Pomeranz gave Once Were Warriors four stars out of five while Stratton gave it four point five.

A 2014 New Zealand survey voted Once Were Warriors the best New Zealand film of all time.

Box office
The film grossed $114,000 in its opening from 4 New Zealand cinemas, breaking records. It became the highest-grossing film ever released in New Zealand with a gross of NZ$6.7 million, surpassing Jurassic Park.

Year-end lists 
 Honorable mention –  Glenn Lovell, San Jose Mercury News

Sequels
 A sequel to the film, What Becomes of the Broken Hearted? was produced in 1999, based on the 1996 novel of the same name. It was also a critical and box office success, but somewhat lesser than the original film.
 The third book in the trilogy, Jake's Long Shadow (2002), has not been made into a movie.

In other media
Once Were the Cast of Warriors (2014) is a documentary film made for the 20th anniversary of the original release of Once Were Warriors.

References

External links

 Once Were Warriors on NZ On Screen - behind-the-scenes footage and interviews as well as the film trailer. Free to view (Flash required)
 

1990s New Zealand films
1994 films
1994 drama films
New Zealand drama films
Films about violence against women
1990s English-language films
Māori-language films
Films based on New Zealand novels
Films about alcoholism
Films about domestic violence
Films about child sexual abuse
Films about rape
Films directed by Lee Tamahori
Films set in Auckland
Films set in 1994
Films shot in New Zealand
1990s gang films
1994 directorial debut films
Films about Māori people